Notre Dame High School, Inc. (NDHS) is a coeducational Roman Catholic high school located in Talofofo, in the United States territory of Guam.

Overview 
The school, owned and operated by the School Sisters of Notre Dame, is in the territory of the Roman Catholic Archdiocese of Agaña. The school is accredited by the Western Association of Schools and Colleges.

History 
The school was established in 1968. In 1995 the school began admitting boys, making it Guam's first co-educational Catholic high school.

Notable people 
 Joanne M. Brown, Politician. 
 Christine S. Calvo - Businesswoman and former First Lady of Guam.

Gallery

References

External links

 Notre Dame High School
 Notre Dame High School (Old website, Archive)

Catholic secondary schools in Guam
Educational institutions established in 1968
Girls' schools in the United States
School Sisters of Notre Dame schools
1968 establishments in Guam
Talofofo, Guam